Episparis taiwana is a species of moth in the family Erebidae. The species is found in Taiwan.

The wingspan is 39–43 mm.

References

Moths described in 1929
Pangraptinae